Atia Union is a union of Delduar Upazila, Tangail District, Bangladesh. It is situated at 9 km south of Tangail.

Demographics

According to Population Census 2011 performed by Bangladesh Bureau of Statistics, The total population of Atia union is 30428. There are 6915 households in total.

Education

The literacy rate of Atia Union is 51.8% (Male-56.7%, Female-46.9%).

See also
 Union Councils of Tangail District

References

Populated places in Dhaka Division
Populated places in Tangail District
Unions of Delduar Upazila